Blue Rose is a fantasy role-playing game published by Green Ronin Publishing in 2005. The game is in the romantic fantasy genre—it is inspired by fantasy fiction such as that of Mercedes Lackey and Diane Duane as opposed to Robert E. Howard–style of swords and sorcery. In romantic fantasy the emphasis is on role-playing and character interaction more than on combat. The game uses a derivative of the D20 system, called True20. Green Ronin subsequently released True20 as a separate system without a setting and genre neutral.

In early 2015 Green Ronin President Chris Pramas announced the company would Kickstart a new edition of the game using the Adventure Game Engine, the same ruleset used in the Dragon Age tabletop RPG. This new edition was published in May 2017.

Setting 
Blue Rose is set in a world called Aldea, and most campaigns center around the Kingdom of Aldis. Aldis is a monarchy whose ruler is chosen by divine intervention rather than inheritance. The current ruler is Queen Jaellin, who earned the throne when "the Golden Hart", a being symbolizing rightful rulership, chose her over rival contenders. Populations of sentient telepathic animals are prevalent in Aldis (talking animals are a common theme in fantasy literature, but far less so in role-playing) and are considered equal citizens on par with humans.

Aldis endures tense relations with Jarzon, a neighboring realm of religious zealots. Both nations are threatened by Kern, an evil kingdom of necromancers, and have occasionally operated as uneasy allies against the common aggressor.

Reception 
Upon initial release, Blue Rose was met with general approval and even some acclaim by the gaming hobby. The greatest attention was directed at the rules system, which was praised as a skillful slimming down of the comparatively more cumbersome d20 rules. Two supplemental books were published (in addition to the original core rulebook): Blue Rose Companion and World of Aldea.

Green Ronin later released True20 as a separate game, without any default setting. The company now treats Blue Rose as one setting for True20 - for example, the Blue Rose forum was abandoned and replaced with a section in the True20 forum.

Blue Rose won the Gen Con ENWorld Roleplaying Silver Medal for Best Cover Art, Best Rules, and Best d20 Game in 2005.

Reviews
Pyramid

References

External links 
The New Noble Assembly: The Official Forum for Blue Rose
The Green Ronin power search page on RPG.net contain 6 different reviews of Blue Rose all linked to extensive discussion.

ENnies winners
Fantasy role-playing games
Green Ronin Publishing games
Role-playing games introduced in 2005